The Center for Research Libraries (also known by its acronym, CRL) is a consortium of North American universities, colleges, and independent research libraries, based on a buy-in concept for membership of the consortia. The consortium acquires and preserves traditional and digital resources for research and teaching and makes them available to member institutions through interlibrary loan and electronic delivery. It also gathers and analyzes data pertaining to the preservation of physical and digital resources, and fosters the sharing of expertise, in order to assist member libraries in maintaining their collections.  The Center for Research Libraries was founded in 1949, as the Midwest Inter-Library Center (MILC). The traditional role of CRL was as an aggregator of tangible collection materials, however this has been updated in the digital age into the CRL's current role as a facilitator of collection development, digitization, and licensing collections by individual libraries and interest groups. This transformation required CRL to adopt new funding models from partnerships with key organizations, and an updated use of current technology to support community outreach and engagement. The funding was provided by the Andrew W. Mellon Foundation, the National Science Foundation, and the IMLS.

History
When the Center for Research Libraries was founded in 1949, it was a product of the post World War II era, and focused specifically on print materials. It was established by 10 Mid-western universities, and was established to support humanities studies and social science research efforts. CRL was originally built to manage a collective collection that no one university could maintain, and contents included foreign newspapers, government documents, microform archives, historic journals, foreign dissertations, and other material identified as critical to research. Since 2013, CRL has hosted NERL, originally known as the NorthEast Research Libraries Consortium, an academic library consortium that negotiates licenses for online products on behalf of 28 member academic research libraries and 80 affiliates.

Digital era
The introduction of the internet and current technology meant that the relevancy of a physical repository became less important. Concerns shifted to the impact of globalization initiatives such as the financial industry, policy sector research, development of advanced information and text processing software applications to serve the for-profit research industry. This new strategy had CRL break down their areas of resources into three main areas of service:

1. Expanding electronic access to critical primary source materials, particularly news, archives, historic journals, and government information, for the CRL community through systematic digitization of CRL and member library collections and digitization of source materials to support specific scholarly projects.
2. Supporting informed investment in digital resources and preservation by making available to CRL libraries actionable information on digital repositories, collections, and services.
3. Ensuring continuous, long-term access to "last-copy" paper and microform collections for the CRL community through coordinated archiving and collection-sharing arrangements with key partners.

In 2008, the Center for Research Libraries was awarded a $1.45 million grant from the Andrew W. Mellon Foundation to support this initiative.

Global Resources Forum
The economic downturn of 2007–2008 resulted in reduced library budgets, and with respect to out of control publisher pricing, many universities cut their budgets for maintaining print journal subscriptions. CRL came together to attempt to support continued access to these print journal collections, and one result of this effort was the Print Archives Preservation Registry (PAPR). PAPR is part of a larger program entitled the Global Resources Forum (GRF) that supports library and consortia decision-making on collection management and investment. "One of several components of a larger CRL program of support for consortia decision-making on collection management and investment, the Global Resources Forum. The Global Resources Forum (GRF) evolved from CRL's longstanding cooperative collection-building efforts, and applies the successful template for those area studies programs to the broader sphere of humanities and social science resources. Like the Area Microform and Global Resources projects, GRF activities leverage for the common good the formidable pool of expertise and knowledge on traditional and digital collections that exists among CRL's extensive community." Ultimately, the GRF combines open access online resources such as data and analysis with limited-participation in both virtual and in-person roundtable discussions. These discussions include publication of audits of repositories like Portico, and examination of databases of primary source collections in areas of interest, which in turn provide critical information by which CRL libraries can base their acquisition policy and collection decisions. "In some instances the databases evaluated are digital versions of collections that CRL holds in microform or in print, and thus offer the prospect of replacing microfilm or hard copy delivery with electronic access."

Administration and membership
CRL is governed by a Board of Directors made up of library directors from member institutions.  The member libraries contribute a percentage of their own collection-development budget to CRL as an annual membership fee.  Many libraries are CRL members as a result of their belonging to consortia which are themselves members. There are 250 libraries who are members of the CRL.

Member list

Projects

The Center oversees the International Coalition on Newspapers (est. 1999), an effort to "promote the accessibility and preservation of international newspaper collections".

Collections

CRL houses large collective collections of newspapers, international doctoral dissertations, government documents and publications, international serials, and Russian monographs.

Access

CRL's holdings are in OCLC's WorldCat.  Items are loaned to members at no charge, while non-members are charged for access to the collections.

Notes

Further reading
 Thomas, Sarah E. "Collection development at the Center for Research Libraries: policy and practice" College & research libraries  1985, vol. 46, no3, pp. 230–235 
 Rutledge, John; Swindler, Luke; "Evaluating membership in a resource-sharing program: the center for research libraries" College & research libraries 1988, vol. 49, no. 5, pp. 409–424  
 The RLG-National Archives and Records Administration Digital Repository Certification Task Force. "Trustworthy Repositories Audit & Certification: Criteria and Checklist". Center for Research Libraries and OCLC, 2007.

External links
 Center for Research Libraries website
 Center for Research Libraries catalog

Library consortia with members in multiple states
Research libraries in the United States
Organizations based in Chicago